Gesvan may refer to:
 Gesvan 1
 Gesvan 2
 Gesvan 3